The Dancer from Atlantis is a science fiction novel by American writer Poul Anderson, first published in 1971 by Doubleday.

Characters 
 Duncan Reid
 Erissa
 Oleg Vladimirovici
 Uldin

References

External links 
 
  Poul Anderson, The Dancer from Atlantis, book review, SpaceRamblings.com, August 9, 2009

1971 American novels
1971 science fiction novels
American science fiction novels
Atlantis in fiction
Novels about time travel
Novels by Poul Anderson